Antoinette Hilario Jadaone (born April 3, 1984) is a Filipina filmmaker and podcaster, best known for directing That Thing Called Tadhana (2014), Love You to the Stars and Back (2017), Never Not Love You (2018), Alone/Together (2019), and Fan Girl (2020). She is usually a resident director of ABS-CBN Entertainment and Star Cinema. She is also the co-host of the talk podcast show Ang Walang Kwentang Podcast alongside fellow director JP Habac.

Filmography

Film

Television

Awards

References

External links
 

1984 births
Living people
Filipino film directors
Filipino television directors
Filipino women film directors
University of the Philippines alumni
Women television directors